Opisthoteuthis grimaldii is an octopus found near the Azores.

This species lives far deeper than other Opisthoteuthis members in the Atlantic. The type specimen, upon which the species' description was based, was captured near Faial Island. The octopus has been found as far south as Namibian waters and as far north as British waters. In the early 1900s, many octopuses living all over the Atlantic and Indian oceans were classed as Opisthoteuthis grimaldii, but later scientists decided that only those specimens found in the Eastern Atlantic Ocean actually belonged to the species.

This octopus occupies in the bathyal zone, a deep area of the ocean where no sunlight reaches. Like many other cirrate octopuses, it lives on or just above the seafloor.

Opisthoteuthis grimaldii is anatomically very similar to Opisthoteuthis borealis, but the two species have differently structured digestive systems. It has also been confused with Opisthoteuthis massyae.

The octopus is only known from male specimens. Mature males have a few enlarged suckers on each arm; enlarged suckers are typical for males in the genus Opisthoteuthis. One potential female specimen has been found; however, it may not belong to the species.

The octopus has between 73 and 80 suckers on each arm. A fleshy web almost entirely covers O. grimaldii's arms. Like many cirrate octopuses, it doesn't have a radula.

References

Octopuses
Molluscs described in 1903
Molluscs of the Atlantic Ocean
Marine molluscs of Africa
Marine molluscs of Europe